Andrei Neagoe (born 24 April 1987) is a Romanian footballer who played as a midfielder for CSA Steaua București.

Personal life
He has a brother, Robert Neagoe, who also plays football.

References

External links
 
 
 

1987 births
Living people
Sportspeople from Pitești
Romanian footballers
Association football midfielders
Liga I players
CS Mioveni players
FC Argeș Pitești players
FC Unirea Urziceni players
FC Progresul București players
Liga II players
FC Politehnica Iași (2010) players
FC UTA Arad players
FCV Farul Constanța players
SCM Râmnicu Vâlcea players
CS Sportul Snagov players
AFC Chindia Târgoviște players
CS Afumați players
CSA Steaua București footballers